Igor Aleksandrovich Chernyshov (born 26 June 1984) is a Russian professional footballer.

Club career
He made his debut in the Russian Premier League for FC Rostov on 23 July 2005 in a game against FC Shinnik Yaroslavl.

References

1984 births
People from Chernsky District
Living people
Russian footballers
Russia under-21 international footballers
Association football midfielders
Russian Premier League players
FC Elista players
FC Rostov players
FC SKA Rostov-on-Don players
FC Volgar Astrakhan players
FC Torpedo Moscow players
PFC Spartak Nalchik players
FC Sokol Saratov players
FC Khimki players
FC Irtysh Omsk players
FC Dynamo Saint Petersburg players
FC Dynamo Stavropol players
FC Novokuznetsk players
Sportspeople from Tula Oblast